Jethwara is a village in Lakshamanpur Mandal, Pratapgarh District in Uttar Pradesh, India located 14.7 km from its district main city Pratapgarh and 141 km from its state main city Lucknow.

References

Villages in Pratapgarh district, Uttar Pradesh